Taco Bell is an American-based chain of fast food restaurants founded in 1962 by Glen Bell (1923–2010) in Downey, California. Taco Bell is a subsidiary of Yum! Brands, Inc. The restaurants serve a variety of Mexican-inspired foods, including tacos, burritos, quesadillas, nachos, novelty and speciality items, and a variety of "value menu" items. , Taco Bell serves over  customers each year, at 7,072 restaurants, more than 93 percent of which are owned and operated by independent franchisees and licensees.

PepsiCo purchased Taco Bell in 1978, and later spun off its restaurants division as Tricon Global Restaurants, which later changed its name to Yum! Brands.

History 

Taco Bell was founded by Glen Bell, an entrepreneur who first opened a hot dog stand called Bell's Drive-In in San Bernardino, California, in 1948. Bell watched long lines of customers at a Mexican restaurant called the Mitla Cafe, located across the street, which became famous among residents for its hard-shelled tacos. Bell attempted to reverse-engineer the recipe, and eventually the owners allowed him to see how the tacos were made. He took what he had learned and opened a new stand in 1951. The name underwent several changes, from Taco-Tia through El Taco, before settling on Taco Bell.

Glen Bell opened the first Taco Bell in 1962 at 7112 Firestone Boulevard in Downey, California. Currently there is a Taco Bell location across the street at 7127 Firestone Blvd, in Downey. The original location was a  building about the size of a two-car garage, and was built with Mission-style arches that covered a small walk-up window that served the original menu items: Tostadas, burritos, frijoles, chiliburgers, and tacos, all for 19 cents ($ in  dollars ). The first restaurant closed in 1986, while the building was saved from demolition November 19, 2015, and was moved  to the Taco Bell Corporate Office at 1 Glen Bell Way in Irvine and is currently stored intact on the corporate parking lot premises and known as "Taco Bell Numero Uno".

In 1964, the first franchisee opened, in Torrance, California, at the intersection of West Carson Street and South Western Avenue which still exists but has been repurposed at 1647 West Carson Street. In 1967, the 100th restaurant opened at 400 South Brookhurst in Anaheim which was later replaced by a new restaurant at 324 South Brookhurst. The first location east of the Mississippi River opened on East Main Street in Springfield, Ohio, in 1968. Original Taco Bells only featured walk-up windows without indoor seating or drive-thru service and former original Taco Bell locations still survive while having been repurposed, frequently as other Mexican restaurants. In 1970, Taco Bell went public with 325 restaurants.

The corporate office has had a few locations, and previously maintained an office at 2516 Via Tejon in Palos Verdes, then at 2424 Moreton Street in Torrance before settling into Irvine more than 40 years ago in 1976 at 17901 Von Karman Avenue.

PepsiCo subsidiary 

In 1978, PepsiCo purchased Taco Bell from Glen Bell. Several locations in the Midwestern United States were converted from Zantigo, a Minneapolis, Minnesota-based Mexican chain which PepsiCo acquired in 1986. In 1990, the Hot 'n Now chain was acquired. Taco Bell sold Hot 'n Now to a Connecticut company in 1997.

In 1991, Taco Bell opened the first Taco Bell Express in San Francisco. Taco Bell Express locations operate primarily inside convenience stores, truck stops, shopping malls, and airports. Taco Bell began co-branding with KFC in 1995 when the first such co-brand opened in Clayton, North Carolina. The chain has since co-branded with Pizza Hut and Long John Silver's as well.

In 1997, PepsiCo experimented with a new "fresh grill" concept, opening at least one Border Bell restaurant in Mountain View, California, on El Camino Real (SR 82). Close to the time that PepsiCo spun off its restaurant business in 1997, the Border Bell in Mountain View was closed and converted to a Taco Bell restaurant which was still open in 2018.

In September 2000, up to $50 million worth of Taco Bell-branded shells were recalled from supermarkets. The shells contained a variety of genetically modified corn called StarLink that was not approved for human consumption. StarLink was approved only for use in animal feed because of questions about whether it can cause allergic reactions in people. It was the first-ever recall of genetically modified food (GMO). Corn was not segregated at grain elevators and the miller in Texas did not order that type. In 2001, Tricon Global announced a $60 million settlement with the suppliers. They stated that it would go to Taco Bell franchisees and TGR would not take any of it.

Yum! Brands subsidiary 
PepsiCo spun out Taco Bell and its other restaurant chains in late 1997 in Tricon Global Restaurants. With the purchase of Yorkshire Global Restaurants, the owners of A&W and Long John Silver's chains, Tricon changed its name to Yum! Brands on May 16, 2002.

In March 2005, the Coalition of Immokalee Workers (CIW) won a landmark victory in its national boycott of Taco Bell for human rights. Taco Bell agreed to meet all the coalition's demands to improve wages and working conditions for Florida tomato pickers in its supply chain. After four years of boycott, Taco Bell and Yum! Brands agreed to make an agreement called the CIW-Yum agreement with representatives of CIW at Yum! Brands headquarters.

Taco Bell began experimenting with fast-casual and urban concepts when it created U.S. Taco Co. and Urban Taproom in 2014 reflecting a market shift due to the popularity of Chipotle Mexican Grill. The menu consisted of tacos with American fillings, and did not sell the food sold in Taco Bell restaurants such as burritos. It was launched in Huntington Beach, California, in August 2014. U.S. Taco Co. closed on September 15, 2015, so the company could focus on its new similar Taco Bell Cantina concept, which featured special menu items and served alcohol. It opened its first location a few days later in Chicago's Wicker Park neighborhood, followed by a location in San Francisco about a month later, located less than a block away from AT&T Park. In 2016, Taco Bell launched the Taco Bell Cantina flagship store located on the Las Vegas strip. The 24-hour restaurant serves alcohol, unique menu items, and features a DJ. It was announced in August 2017 that the store would begin hosting weddings. Taco Bell Cantina currently has locations in San Francisco, Berkeley, Chicago (2 locations), Las Vegas, Austin, Fayetteville, Cincinnati, Cleveland, Atlanta, Newport Beach, San Diego, San Jose, Nashville, with plans to open soon in Somerville, Massachusetts. In March 2020, Taco Bell announced that it would be converting 3 of its suburban stores into Cantinas this year as part of a test run.

In March 2016, Taco Bell introduced private beta testing of an artificial intelligence bot on the messaging platform Slack designed to take orders of select menu items from local Taco Bell locations and have the orders delivered. Taco Bell plans to have a wider roll-out of this functionality in the coming months.

Previously, Taco Bell's hot sauces were only available in packets at the chain itself. In February 2014, Taco Bell made its hot sauces available at grocery stores, sold in bottles. These would be followed by further grocery store products including chips in May 2018  and shredded cheese in 2019.  In September 2016, Taco Bell opened a pop-up in New York City in the SoHo, Manhattan area called the Taco Bell VR Arcade. Taco Bell and VR fans could demo PlayStation VR, games, and food.

In 2016, Taco Bell built a restaurant out of five cargo shipping containers for the Texas music festival, South by Southwest. Due to popularity, the franchise decided to move the restaurant to a lot in South Gate, California, and it opened to the public a year later. The restaurant features Taco Bell's full menu, with outdoor seating, a walk-up window, and a drive-thru, but no indoor seating unlike regular Taco Bell locations. Taco Bell announced plans in November 2017 to open 300 more urban and Cantina-style locations by 2022, with 50 to be located about New York City's five boroughs. In 2019 Taco Bell opened a pop-up hotel called "The Bell: A Taco Bell Hotel and Resort" for one weekend in August. Upon the announcement the hotel was booked up in two minutes 

Taco Bell announced plans to stay in its current corporate headquarters in Irvine until 2030.

Menu and advertising  
In 1992, Johnny Cash starred in a television commercial for Taco Bell's value menu.

In 1993, Taco Bell was part of product placement for the movie Demolition Man and updated their currently used logo.

In March 2001, Taco Bell announced a promotion to coincide with the re-entry of the Mir space station. They towed a large target out into the Pacific Ocean, announcing that if the target was hit by a falling piece of Mir, every person in the United States would be entitled to a free Taco Bell taco. The company bought a sizable insurance policy for this gamble. No piece of the station struck the target.

In 2004, a local Taco Bell franchisee bought the naming rights to the Boise State Pavilion in Boise, Idaho, and renamed the stadium Taco Bell Arena. Also, in 2004, Mountain Dew offered Taco Bell stores the exclusive right to carry Mountain Dew Baja Blast, a tropical lime flavor of the popular soft drink.

In 2005, Taco Bell released the menu item called the Crunchwrap Supreme.

In 2007, Taco Bell first offered the "Steal a Base, Steal a Taco" promotion—if any player from either team stole a base in the World Series, the company would give away free tacos to everyone in the United States in a campaign similar to the Mir promotion, albeit with a much higher likelihood of being realized. After Jacoby Ellsbury of the Boston Red Sox stole a base in Game 2, the company made good on the promotion on October 30, 2007. The promotion has subsequently been offered in multiple World Series, most recently in 2022, with Kyle Schwarber of the Philadelphia Phillies successfully stealing a base in Game 1.

Taco Bell sponsors a promotion at home games for both the Portland Trail Blazers and the Cleveland Cavaliers in which everyone in attendance receives a coupon for a free Chalupa if the home team scores 100 points or more.

In 2009, Taco Bell introduced a music video style commercial entitled "It's all about the Roosevelts" composed and produced by Danny de Matos at his studio for Amber Music on behalf of DraftFCB Agency. Featuring, Varsity Fanclub's Bobby Edner, the rap music style commercial shows a group of friends gathering change as they drive toward Taco Bell. The commercial represents Taco Bell's first foray into movie theater advertising, featuring the ad during the opening previews of Transformers: Revenge of the Fallen and Public Enemies as well as screens in some movie theater lobbies.

On July 1, 2009, Taco Bell replaced 20-year sponsor McDonald's as the fast-food partner of the NBA. Taco Bell and the NBA agreed on a 4-year deal allowing them to advertise on ABC, TNT and ESPN, and NBA-themed promotions. On July 21, 2009, Gidget, the Chihuahua featured in Taco Bell ads in the late 1990s, was euthanized after suffering a stroke.  She was 15 years old. 2009 commercials for the "Frutista Freeze" frozen drink feature Snowball, an Eleonora cockatoo noted for his ability to dance to human music. In an effort to promote its $2 Meal Deals, Taco Bell started a Facebook group in June 2010 to collect signatures on a petition that appeals to the Federal Reserve to produce more two-dollar bills.

A large advertising push by Taco Bell was begun in late February 2011 in response to a consumer protection lawsuit filed against the company by an Alabama law firm. The promotion sought to counter allegations that the company falsely advertised the ratio of ingredients in its beef filling for its tacos. The spots featured employees and franchisees stating that the filling has always been a mixture of 88% beef and various spices and binders and nothing else. The ad followed several full-page print ads in the New York Times and other newspapers that featured the headline "Thank you for suing us." Additionally, the chain added a new social campaign using Twitter and Facebook. The company invested heavily in the campaign, spending more than $3 million (USD) putting out its message—about 20 percent more than the company usually spends on an advertising program. The various campaigns came shortly before the company began its official response to the suit in the United States District Court for the Central District of California and were designed to bring public opinion into their camp. Various analysts stated that the company would have been better off using a grass-root campaign that involved in store advertising and other non-broadcast media. The suit was eventually withdrawn, and the company continued its advertising response by publicly requesting an apology from the suing firm of Beasley Allen. Analyst Laura Ries, of marketing strategy firm Ries & Ries, stated she believed Taco Bell's latest response was a mistake. She commented that reviving memories of a suit that the majority of the public had forgotten after the initial burst of publicity was the wrong strategy from Taco Bell.

In March 2012, Taco Bell teamed up with Frito-Lay and created the Doritos Locos Tacos, which is a taco with a Dorito Nacho Cheese flavored taco shell. Taco Bell is releasing a Mountain Dew infused drink called Mountain Dew A.M.

On June 6, 2012, Taco Bell announced it would be testing a new "Cantina Menu" with upscale items in their Kentucky and California restaurants. The new menu was created by celebrity chef Lorena Garcia, and featured the addition of: Black Beans; Cilantro Rice; Citrus & Herb Marinated Chicken; and Cilantro Dressing.

The Cool Ranch Doritos Taco, became available to order on March 7, 2013.  Shortly before its release, Taco Bell launched a promotion advertising that fans could get the new flavor at its stores a day early if they "just asked" on March 6. However, they neglected to inform the majority of their stores of this – leading to numerous complaints on its social media accounts and news sites from disappointed consumers who were unable to obtain the new taco.

On July 23, 2013, Taco Bell announced they were discontinuing the sale of kids' meals and accompanying toys at all of their U.S.–based restaurants by January 2014. Some outlets ceased their sale as early as July 2013.

On August 6, 2013, the chain announced it was expanding its test market of "Waffle Tacos" to ≈100 restaurants in Fresno, California, Omaha, Nebraska, and Chattanooga, Tennessee, beginning on August 8 of that year. The Waffle Taco included scrambled eggs, sausage, and a side of syrup. It was the top–selling item during breakfast hours at the five Southern California restaurants where they had been test–released earlier in 2013. The breakfast menu started on March 27, 2014. Other items include: the A.M. Crunchwrap, Cinnabon Delights, Breakfast Burrito, A.M. Grilled Sausage Flatbread Melt, Hash Browns, Coffee and Orange Juice. The ad–campaign, which began March 27, used twenty-five men who were named Ronald McDonald, a reference to the famous clown mascot of McDonald's. Another commercial advertisement for the Waffle Taco, features the narrator singing, "I've been eating Egg McMuffins since 1984.  But when I saw Taco Bell made a Waffle Taco, I figured I would get with the times" set to the tune of "Old MacDonald Had a Farm"— another shot at McDonald's.

On April 28, 2014, Taco Bell ridiculed McDonald's for its "out–dated muffins", in a breakfast campaign devised by Taylor. The advertisement stated the claim that the McMuffin belonged in 1984. In October 2014, Taco Bell launched the Pink Strawberry Starburst Freeze beverage for a limited time. In August 2016, Taco Bell brought back its Pink Strawberry Starburst Freeze. In October 2015, Taco Bell launched a certified vegetarian menu.

In August 2016, Taco Bell announced it would begin testing a mashup known as Cheetos Burritos at select Taco Bell restaurants On September 19, 2016, Taco Bell launched Airheads Freeze, a drink inspired by the candy Airheads White Mystery, and allow people to guess its flavor on social media. On September 15, 2016, Taco Bell introduced the Cheddar Habanero Quesarito, a quesadilla shelled burrito. In April 2017, Taco Bell announced that it will begin testing the Naked Breakfast Taco in Flint, Michigan in mid-April. The breakfast taco, which uses a fried egg as the shell for potato bites, nacho cheese, shredded cheddar, and bacon or sausage crumble.

In 2017, the company released the Naked Chicken Chalupa that uses a chalupa shell made from chicken, using a similar idea to the Double Down and later that year the Naked Chicken Chips, which are chicken nuggets shaped like chips with nacho cheese.

In July 2017, Taco Bell announced a partnership with Lyft in which Lyft passengers in Orange County, California, can request "Taco Mode" on their way to their destination from 9 PM to 2 AM, having a stop at Taco Bell. The program was cancelled after much negative feedback from drivers.

On September 21, 2018, Taco Bell announced National Taco Day celebrating its global reach outside of the United States, to be celebrated in 20 countries.

In January 2019, Taco Bell nearly doubled its television advertising spending to US$64 million.

In September 2019, Taco Bell revamped their menu, for the Fall Season.

In July 2020, Taco Bell announced the Grilled Cheese Burrito. The burrito is a recurring menu item that occasionally reappears for a limited time.

In January 2021, Taco Bell announced the return of potatoes to the menu after a brief discontinuation in August 2020 in efforts to streamline processes in their restaurants in response to the COVID-19 pandemic. In addition to the potatoes, the company had announced plans to expand their vegetarian menu by introducing Beyond Meat as a plant-based vegetarian customization option.

In April 2021, Taco Bell said that it will start reusing hot sauce packets in partnership with the recycling company TerraCycle, aiming to reduce the environmental pollution.

In August 2021, Taco Bell announced the Crispy Chicken Sandwich Taco.

On April 18, 2022, Taco Bell announced that Mexican Pizza will return to its menu on May 19, after having previously been discontinued in November 2020.

On January 6, 2022, Taco Bell launched a digital taco subscription service called the Taco Lover's Pass through the company app. For the cost of $10, a customer can order one of seven different tacos each day for 30 consecutive days.

Dollar Cravings 
On August 18, 2014, Taco Bell launched a new value menu called Dollar Cravings. Replacing the old Why Pay More menu, Dollar Cravings currently contains thirteen food items all priced at a United States dollar.

It was renamed "Cravings Value Menu", when prices were increased on some of the items. In April 2019, they introduced a "loaded nacho taco" for a dollar.

Discontinued menu items 

One of Taco Bell's original 1960s menu items was the Chiliburger, later known as the Bell Burger, then the Bell Beefer. This was a loose meat sandwich with taco-seasoned ground beef, shredded cheese and lettuce, diced onions and tomato with mild red sauce, served on a steamed hamburger bun. The sandwich was removed from the menu sometime in the late 1980s to keep a strictly Tex Mex-inspired line up.

Other discontinued items include: Enchirito (name revived for a different menu item); Taco Lite; Taco Grande; Chilito (Chili Cheese Burrito); Beefy Crunch Burrito; Beefy Melt Burrito; Seafood Salad; Chicken Fiesta Burrito; Potatorito; Volcano Taco; BLT Taco; Cheesarito; Cinnamon Crispas; Nacho Crunch Grilled Stuft Burrito; Chicken Caesar Grilled Stuft Burrito; Grilled Stuft Nacho; Fully Loaded Nachos; Crunchwrap Sliders; Blackjack Taco; Bean Burrito Especial; Border Ices; and the Meximelt.

In September 2019, Taco Bell made new changes to its menu. Items discontinued from there include: Beefy Mini Quesadilla; Chips and Salsa; Chipotle Chicken Loaded Griller; Double Decker Taco; Cool Ranch and Fiery Doritos Locos Tacos; Double Tostada; Power Menu Burrito, and the XXL Grilled Stuft Burrito.

, the menu underwent another update, discontinuing the following items: Grilled Steak Soft Taco; 7-Layer Burrito; Nachos Supreme; Beefy Fritos Burrito; Spicy Tostada; Triple Layer Nachos; Cheesy Fiesta Potatoes; Loaded Grillers, both Cheesy Potato and Beefy Nacho; Chips & Dips; and Mini Skillet Bowl.

Outside the United States

Asia

China
In 2003, Taco Bell entered the Chinese market by opening a restaurant in the Shanghai People's Square, named "Taco Bell Grande". Three more TBG restaurants opened before they were closed in 2008. Taco Bell relaunched in the Chinese market when a store opened in Pudong, Shanghai in late 2015.

India
India's first Taco Bell outlet opened at the Mantri Square mall in Bangalore in 2010. Taco Bell announced an exclusive national master franchise agreement with Burman Hospitality on May 15, 2019. The chain operated 35 outlets across India as on the same date. Yum! Brands stated that it planned to open 600 new Taco Bell outlets in India by 2029.

Indonesia
Taco Bell opened its first Indonesian restaurant in South Jakarta on December 18, 2020. As of 2022, Taco Bell has since opened three more restaurants in Indonesia, all located in Jakarta.

Malaysia

Taco Bell opened its first Malaysian store in Cyberjaya, Sepang on April 2, 2021. It then opened its second store in Bandar Sri Permaisuri, Kuala Lumpur followed by Tropicana Gardens Mall and Setiawangsa outlets. In early 2022, Taco Bell opened up in Wangsa Maju, Sunway Pyramid, Puchong and has continued in expanding to other states as well. It currently has 13 stores scattered across Klang Valley.

Japan
Taco Bell once operated shops in Tokyo and Nagoya in the 1980s but withdrew several years later. Since then, there were shops only at United States Forces Japan bases. In 2015, Taco Bell returned to the Japanese market with a new shop in the downtown area of Shibuya, Tokyo. It had "Taco rice" and "Shrimp and avocado burrito" on its original menu.

Philippines 

Taco Bell opened its first Philippine branch on October 30, 2004, at the Gateway Mall in Cubao, Quezon City. They now have one on the ground floor and one on the fourth floor in the food court at the Gateway Mall. There is also a branch at the TriNoma mall in Quezon City.

Singapore
Taco Bell in Singapore existed for a number of years, mostly as combination stores with KFC such as the one that operated at the Funan Digital Life Mall, but in 2008, Taco Bell completely pulled out of Singapore.

South Korea
There are currently two locations in Seoul, in the Itaewon and Hongdae districts, which attract the most foreigners and college students. The two branches opened in the summer of 2010, Itaewon's branch coming first. A Taco Bell had long been a presence at the U.S. Army's Yongsan Garrison, which is off-limits to non-military personnel, and for a time there was a tongue-in-cheek grassroots campaign by non-Korean, non-military foreigners in Seoul to get another Taco Bell location.

Sri Lanka
In July 2017, Taco Bell opened an outlet in Colombo, Sri Lanka.

Europe

Cyprus

A Taco Bell opened in Cyprus in December 2009 in Limassol at the MY MALL Limassol. Further restaurants are planned to be opened within the next 18 months (probably also in Cyprus' capital Nicosia).

Finland

On June 15, 2017, Finnish restaurant company   announced that it is bringing Taco Bell to Finland. The first restaurant opened in central Helsinki on November 9, 2017. Restaurants in Sello and Iso Omena malls in Espoo opened later in November 2017. Finland is the first country to include pulled oats (a meat substitute) in the menu. In 2019, the Taco bell expanded outside the Helsinki Metropolitan area to Lappeenranta and Turku. In July 2021, a new branch will be opened in Oulu. As of November 2022 there are 16 Taco Bell restaurants in Finland, most of them in the Greater Helsinki area.

Greece

Greece's first Taco Bell opened in Athens upon the grand opening of the newly constructed Athens Metro Mall on November 30, 2010. The restaurant closed in August 2012 and the chain withdrew from the Greek market due to the country's recession.

Iceland
Taco Bell in Iceland is operated as a part of the KFC establishment in Hafnarfjörður, suburb of Reykjavík. It was established in late 2006, after the departure of the U.S. Navy from Naval Air Station Keflavik. A second location opened in the Ártúnshöfði part of Reykjavík in November 2008.

Netherlands
On April 4, 2017, Taco Bell opened its first restaurant in Eindhoven, Netherlands. On October 12, Taco Bell opened another restaurant in Tilburg. A third restaurant has opened in Breda.

Poland
The first Polish Taco Bell store was opened in 1993. Following an aggressive campaign of expansion, Taco Bell's efforts soon withered, and the chain withdrew from Poland shortly thereafter.

Portugal 
The first Taco Bell store was opened in 2019, with 11 restaurants spread across the country in 2021.

Romania
The first Taco Bell store opened in Romania's capital, Bucharest, on October 12, 2017, and there are currently 13 stores on the Romanian market. For the time being, Romania is the only country in Eastern Europe that has a Taco Bell store.

Russia
In the early 1990s, PepsiCo opened several Taco Bell locations inside the Moscow metro system, including Metro Park Kulturi and Metro Komsomolskaya. This experiment lasted only a few years but these locations live on under different ownership and a different name.

Spain
Spain is the most important market for Taco Bell in Europe. There are 67 Taco Bell branches by late 2019, more than twice than in 2017 when Taco Bell had 32 branches in Spain. The first Taco Bell in Spain was opened at Naval Station Rota in 2004 and is available only to those authorized to access the naval base. The first Taco Bell for the public was opened in the Islazul Shopping Mall, Madrid, in December 2008.  Yum! Brands announced that it would open additional restaurants in Spain in early 2009 as part of a test trial for the European market. The second location of Taco Bell in Spain was opened at the La Vaguada Shopping Mall, Madrid (03/2010). Taco Bell announced, at least, 10 new restaurants through Spain.

As of March 2017, there are 32 Taco Bell restaurants in Spain; 13 of them are in Madrid, and the other 19 Taco Bell are distributed through Valencia (5), Málaga (2), Barcelona (2), Zaragoza (2), Alicante (2) and Jerez de la Frontera, Murcia, Cádiz, Granada, Sevilla and Naval Station Rota with 1 restaurant.

United Kingdom
The United Kingdom was the first European country with a Taco Bell. In 1986, a location was opened in London on Coventry Street (between Leicester Square and Piccadilly Circus) followed by a second location in Earl's Court near the Earl's Court tube station. One other store opened in Uxbridge but all closed in the mid-1990s. In 1994, the university food provider Compass announced plans for outlets on its university and college sites. However, only one store was opened at Birmingham University, which is now closed.

After the Birmingham University branch closed, there were only two Taco Bell branches in the UK, at the Strategic Air Command and United States Air Force bases at RAF Mildenhall and RAF Lakenheath.  Access is restricted to relevant service personnel.

In the late 2000s, Yum! Brands announced that it was reopening Taco Bell locations in the United Kingdom as part of a large planned expansion into Europe. Yum! took advantage of the recent great recession which led to increasing sales at other fast food outlets; it also said that there was now a greater awareness of Mexican food in the UK and that it can be successful with improved menu offerings and marketing. The first new store opened at the Lakeside Shopping Centre in Essex on June 28, 2010. Another store opened in Basildon, Essex, on November 29, 2010, and a third in the Manchester Arndale Food Court on November 7, 2011.

On March 1, 2013, it was announced that trace amounts of horse meat from a European supplier had been found in various food products, including Taco Bell's beef in the UK. By August 2017, there were 17 Taco Bell branches in the United Kingdom, all of which were in England and outside of London. The first Scottish branch was opened in Glasgow in December 2017. As of June 2019 there are 39 branches in Scotland and England, including three in London. Beginning in October 2019, Taco Bell locations in the UK began serving Doritos Locos Tacos.

On 2 March 2020, the first Welsh Taco Bell branch was opened in Cardiff.

More recently, in November 2021, Taco Bell opened its 77th UK store, and a return to the British Midlands with a store in The Royal Town of Sutton Coldfield, Birmingham.

In August 2022 a Taco Bell was opened in Torquay, Devon, the second in the county after Plymouth.

Middle East 
A Taco Bell opened in the United Arab Emirates in November 2008 in Dubai at the Dubai Mall. A fourth UAE location was also planned for Bawadi Mall in the city of Al Ain. As of February 2012, the locations at Dubai Mall, Deira City Centre, and Mirdif City Centre have all closed and Taco Bell has completely pulled out of the Emirati market. Taco Bell is still open in Kuwait and has not been pulled out ever since from the Kuwaiti market.

North America

Canada
Taco Bell has been present in Canada since 1981, with the first store opening in Windsor, Ontario. There are currently Taco Bell locations in 7 of the 10 Canadian provinces: British Columbia, Alberta, Saskatchewan, Manitoba, Ontario, New Brunswick and Nova Scotia. Taco Bell had operated in the province of Quebec for close to 15 years, however announced its withdrawal on January 6, 2022. For some time it was possible to order draft beer with one's order. Taco Bell offers free soda refills in its stores.

On March 31, 2011, Priszm, owner of Taco Bell (Canada), went into bankruptcy protection in Ontario and British Columbia. On May 6, 2011, Priszm Income Fund was delisted from the Toronto Stock Exchange for failure to meet the continued listing requirements.  Since then, some Taco Bell restaurants have been closed down including those in Guelph, Hamilton, and Cambridge, Ontario among others.

Mexico
Taco Bell has attempted to enter the Mexican market twice. After a highly publicised launch in Mexico City in 1992, all the restaurants were closed two years later. In September 2007, Taco Bell returned to Monterrey, projecting an American image with an Americanized menu that included french fries, but it closed in January 2010 due to low patronage.

Oceania

American Samoa
Taco Bell opened its first restaurant in American Samoa in Pago Pago in 2005.

Australia
Taco Bell first opened in Australia in September 1981, but Taco Bell was ordered to change its name after the owner of a local restaurant successfully sued Taco Bell for misleading conduct. The local restaurant was called "Taco Bell's Casa" and had been operating in Australia since the 1970s. The owner successfully argued that Sydneysiders would confuse the takeaway chain with his restaurant, and this would damage his reputation. Taco Bell later opened in 1997 in Australia with a store in the cinema district on George Street, Sydney and a year later in 1998 within a few KFC stores in the state of New South Wales, but by 2005, the Taco Bell brand was pulled out of the country.

On September 13, 2017, Collins Foods announced that Taco Bell would return to the Australian market, with their first store being situated in the Brisbane suburb of Annerley in Queensland using a refurbished Sizzler restaurant which had closed earlier that year. The Annerley store opened on Saturday November 4, 2017 with about 50 people camping out overnight to be first to try the store. The store has 96 seats in indoor and outdoor settings and has an open kitchen so diners can see their food being prepared. There is also a drive-through. The menu appears to be a subset of the US menu based on food tasting research undertaken by the company. The Annerley store does not have a breakfast menu, but offers beers and margaritas similar to their Mexican food competitors in the Australian market. In 2018, Collins Foods signed a development deal with Yum! Brands to open over 50 Taco Bell restaurants across Australia between January 2019 and December 2021. A legal dispute with Victoria-based restaurant chain Taco Bill was resolved in February 2020.

As of January 2023, there are 39 Taco Bell restaurants across Australia; 12 in New South Wales (including one that does not serve pork), 14 in Queensland, nine in Victoria (including one that does not serve pork) and four in Western Australia. By city or town, there are nine in Melbourne, seven in Sydney, five in Brisbane, four each on the Sunshine Coast and in Perth, two on the Gold Coast and one each in Ballina, Cairns, Ipswich, Newcastle, Orange, Tamworth, Townsville and Wollongong. There are also plans to open restaurants in other locations, such as Canberra, the Central Coast, Port Macquarie and Toowoomba.

Guam
Taco Bell operates several stores in Guam.

New Zealand
Taco Bell officially opened its first New Zealand location on November 12, 2019, in the suburb of New Lynn, Auckland.

As of January 2023, there are 14 Taco Bell restaurants across New Zealand; 10 on the North Island and four on the South Island. By city, there are seven in Auckland, three in Christchurch and one each in Dunedin, Rotorua, Taupiri and Wellington.

Northern Mariana Islands
Taco Bell operates one restaurant in the Northern Mariana Islands, located on the island of Saipan.

South America 
There are 15 outlets in Brazil, mainly in the São Paulo area. Taco Bell has fourteen stores in Chile, thirteen of which are operated in conjunction (and in the same facilities) with Pizza Hut. All Taco Bell stores are in shopping malls located mainly in Santiago. There were four outlets in the Bogotá area in Colombia, but these closed in late 2018.

Other countries 
Taco Bell is present in the Dominican Republic, Aruba, Costa Rica, Ecuador, Panama, Portugal and on AAFES military bases in Germany, Italy, Kosovo, Iraq, Brazil, Guatemala, and El Salvador.

Clothing line 

In 2017, Forever 21 produced a clothing line in partnership with Taco Bell, featuring branded T-shirts and sweatshirts, as well as bodysuits made to look like Border Sauce packets.

In November 2019, Taco Bell announced Taco Bell's Taco Shop, an online store with Taco Bell branded merchandise including hoodies and tees, holiday ornaments, inflatable sauce packets, and wedding-related items.

See also 

 Priszm
 Taco Bell chihuahua
 Enchirito

Notes

External links 

 
 
 1970s TV ad for Taco Bell

 
American companies established in 1962
Fast-food franchises
Fast-food chains of the United States
Fast-food Mexican restaurants
Companies based in Irvine, California
1962 establishments in California
Restaurants established in 1962
Companies that have filed for bankruptcy in Canada
Restaurants in Orange County, California
Restaurants in Greater Los Angeles
Yum! Brands
1978 mergers and acquisitions